Hakusan  can refer to:

Mount Haku, located in the Chūbu region  of Japan, one of Japan's "Three Holy Mountains"
Hakusan National Park, a national park surrounding Mount Hakusan
Hakusan, Ishikawa, a city located in Ishikawa, Japan
Hakusan, Mie, a former town located in Mie, Japan

Mount Hakusan (Hyōgo), a mountain located in Hyōgo Prefecture, Japan
Hakusan Station (Tokyo), a metro station in Tokyo, Japan